The Haukar women's basketball team, commonly known as Haukar, is the women's basketball department of Knattspyrnufélagið Haukar multi-sport club, based in the town of Hafnarfjörður, Iceland.

Recent history
On 23 September 2021, Haukar became the first Icelandic women's basketball team to win in a continental competition when it defeated Clube União Sportiva, 81–76, in the first leg of the 2021–22 EuroCup Women qualifiers. In the game, Jana Falsdóttir became the youngest Icelandic female player to play and score in a continental competition, breaking the records of Unnur Tara Jónsdóttir and Ragna Margrét Brynjarsdóttir. On 30 September, Haukar lost the second leg 79–81, after starting the game 2–21, but advanced to the regular season with a combined 160–157 victory.

On January 2023, Haukar won their third straight Icelandic Cup, after defeating Keflavík in the Cup final.

Home court
Haukar play their home games in Ólafssalur (English: Ólaf's hall) in Ásvellir. The court is named after Ólafur Rafnsson, a former Haukar player and president of FIBA Europe.

Trophies and awards

Trophies
Úrvalsdeild kvenna (4):
 2006, 2007, 2009, 2018

Icelandic Basketball Cup (9):
 1984, 1992, 2005, 2007, 2010, 2014, 2021, 2022, 2023

Icelandic Supercup (2):
 2006, 2021

Icelandic Company Cup (4):
 2005, 2006, 2011, 2015

 Division I (1):
2002, 2004

Awards

Úrvalsdeild Women's Domestic Player of the Year
 Hanna Björg Kjartansdóttir – 1992
 Helena Sverrisdóttir – 2005, 2006, 2007, 2016, 2018
 Íris Sverrisdóttir – 2012
 Ragna Margrét Brynjarsdóttir – 2011
 Sóley Indriðadóttir – 1984

Úrvalsdeild Women's Foreign Player of the Year
 Megan Mahoney – 2006
 Slavica Dimovska – 2009
 Heather Ezell – 2010
 Lele Hardy – 2014

Úrvalsdeild Women's Domestic All-First Team
 Eva Margrét Kristjánsdóttir - 2022
 Hanna Björg Kjartansdóttir – 1992
 Helena Sverrisdóttir – 2005, 2006, 2007, 2016, 2018, 2022
 Herdís Erna Gunnarsdóttir – 1988, 1990
 Kristrún Sigurjónsdóttir – 2008, 2009
Sara Rún Hinriksdóttir – 2021
 Sólveig Pálsdóttir – 1988
 Þóra Kristín Jónsdóttir – 2018, 2021

Úrvalsdeild Women's Playoffs MVP
 Megan Mahoney – 2006
 Helena Sverrisdóttir – 2007, 2018
 Slavica Dimovska – 2009

Úrvalsdeild Women's Defensive Player of the Year
 Dýrfinna Arnardóttir – 2018
 Pálína Gunnlaugsdóttir – 2005, 2006, 2007

Úrvalsdeild Women's Young Player of the Year
 Helena Sverrisdóttir – 2003
 Ragna Margrét Brynjarsdóttir – 2007, 2008
 Margrét Rósa Hálfdánardóttir – 2012
 Elísabeth Ýr Ægisdóttir – 2021
 Tinna Guðrún Alexandersdóttir – 2022

Úrvalsdeild kvenna Coach of the Year
 Ágúst Björgvinsson – 2005, 2006, 2007
 Bjarni Magnússon – 2022
 Ingvar Guðjónsson – 2018

Icelandic Cup Finals MVP
 Helena Sverrisdóttir – 2021, 2022
 Lele Hardy – 2014
 María Lind Sigurðardóttir – 2010
 Sólrún Inga Gísladóttir – 2023

Notable players 

 Auður Íris Ólafsdóttir
 Bríet Sif Hinriksdóttir
 Dýrfinna Arnarsdóttir
 Eva Margrét Kristjánsdóttir
 Guðbjörg Norðfjörð
 Guðbjörg Sverrisdóttir
 Guðrún Ósk Ámundadóttir
 Gunnhildur Gunnarsdóttir
 Hanna Hálfdánardóttir
 Hanna Björg Kjartansdóttir
 Hafdís Hafberg
 Helena Sverrisdóttir
 Herdís Erna Gunnarsdóttir
 Jence Ann Rhoads
 Jóhanna Björk Sveinsdóttir
 Kristrún Sigurjónsdóttir
 Lele Hardy
 Lovísa Henningsdóttir
 Margrét Rósa Hálfdánardóttir
 María Lind Sigurðardóttir
 Megan Mahoney
 Pálína Gunnlaugsdóttir
 Ragna Margrét Brynjarsdóttir
 Rósa Björk Pétursdóttir
 Sara Rún Hinriksdóttir
 Sigrún Björg Ólafsdóttir
 Sigrún S. Skarphéðinsdóttir
 Sólveig Pálsdóttir
 Sylvía Rún Hálfdánardóttir
 Telma Björk Fjalarsdóttir
 Unnur Tara Jónsdóttir
 Þóra Kristín Jónsdóttir

Coaches

 Kolbrún Jónsdóttir 1982–1985
 Ingimar Jónsson 1985–1986
 Pálmar Sigurðsson 1986–1987
 Ívar Ásgrímsson 1987–1988
 Pálmar Sigurðsson 1988–1989
 Ívar Ásgrímsson 1989–1991
 Ingvar Jónsson 1991–1992
 Eggert Maríuson 2011–2012
 Predrag Bojovic 2002–2003
 Ágúst S. Björgvinsson 2004–2007
 Yngvi Gunnlaugsson 2007–2009
 Henning Henningsson 2009–2011
 Bjarni Magnússon 2011–2014
 Ívar Ásgrímsson 2014–2015
 Ingvar Þór Guðjónsson,  Andri Þór Kristinsson,  Helena Sverrisdóttir 2015–2016
 Ingvar Þór Guðjónsson 2016–2018
 Ólöf Helga Pálsdóttir 2018–2020
 Bjarni Magnússon 2020 (interim)
 Ari Gunnarsson 2020
 Bjarni Magnússon 2020–present

References

External links
Official Website  

Haukar (basketball)
Hafnarfjörður